Pygmaeocereus bieblii is a species of Pygmaeocereus from Peru.

References

External links
 
 

bieblii
Flora of Peru